Scopula atricapilla  is a moth of the  family Geometridae. It is found in the Democratic Republic of Congo, Kenya and Uganda.

Subspecies
Scopula atricapilla atricapilla
Scopula atricapilla harithensis Wiltshire, 1990

References

Moths described in 1934
Taxa named by Louis Beethoven Prout
atricapilla
Moths of Africa